This is a complete list of former members of the United States House of Representatives whose last names begin with the letter C.

Number of years/terms representative/delegate has served
 
The number of years the representative/delegate has served in Congress indicates the number of terms the representative/delegate has.
Note the representative/delegate can also serve non-consecutive terms if the representative/delegate loses election and wins re-election to the House.

 2 years – 1 or 2 terms 
 4 years – 2 or 3 terms 
 6 years – 3 or 4 terms 
 8 years – 4 or 5 terms 
 10 years – 5 or 6 terms
 12 years – 6 or 7 terms 
 14 years – 7 or 8 terms
 16 years – 8 or 9 terms 
 18 years – 9 or 10 terms 
 20 years – 10 or 11 terms 
 22 years – 11 or 12 terms 
 24 years – 12 or 13 terms 
 26 years – 13 or 14 terms 
 28 years – 14 or 15 terms 
 30 years – 15 or 16 terms 
 32 years – 16 or 17 terms 
 34 years – 17 or 18 terms 
 36 years – 18 or 19 terms 
 38 years – 19 or 20 terms 
 40 years – 20 or 21 terms 
 42 years – 21 or 22 terms 
 44 years – 22 or 23 terms 
 46 years – 23 or 24 terms 
 48 years – 24 or 25 terms 
 50 years – 25 or 26 terms 
 52 years – 26 or 27 terms 
 54 years – 27 or 28 terms 
 56 years – 28 or 29 terms 
 58 years – 29 or 30 terms

External links
 Congressional Biographical Directory

C